Alexander Christie may refer to:

Alexander Christie (governor) (1792–1872), Canadian fur trader and government official
Alexander Christie (artist) (1807–1860), Scottish artist
Alexander Christie (bishop) (1848–1925), Roman Catholic priest and Archbishop of Portland, Oregon
Alexander Graham Christie (1880–1964), Canadian/American mechanical engineer
John Alexander Christie (1895–1967), English recipient of the Victoria Cross
Alexander Christie (portrait painter) (1901–1946), British artist

See also
Alex Christie (disambiguation)